Ye Chongqiu (Chinese: 叶重秋; Pinyin: Yè Chóngqiū; born 29 September 1992 in Shanghai) is a Chinese football player who currently plays for Chinese Super League side Wuhan.

Club career
Ye started his professional football career in 2010 when he was promoted to Chinese Super League newcomer Nanchang Hengyuan's first team squad. On 14 July 2010, he made his senior debut in a goalless draw against Liaoning Whowin, aging 17 years and 288 days, which made him the youngest player in the club's history. Ye became a regular player in the team in the 2011 season. On 10 July 2011, he scored his winning goal near the end of the match against Hangzhou Greentown, which ensured Nanchang's 1–0 home victory. He was demoted to the reserve team in the summer of 2018.

On 22 February 2019, Ye transferred to Super League side Jiangsu Suning, signing a four-year contract.

Career statistics 
Statistics accurate as of match played 31 December 2020.

Honours

Club
Jiangsu Suning
Chinese Super League: 2020

References

External links
 

1992 births
Living people
Chinese footballers
Footballers from Shanghai
Shanghai Shenxin F.C. players
Jiangsu F.C. players
Chinese Super League players
China League One players
Association football midfielders